The 1921–22 Washington State Cougars men's basketball team represented Washington State College for the  college basketball season. Led by fourteenth-year head coach Fred Bohler, the Cougars were members of the Pacific Coast Conference and played their home games on campus in Pullman, Washington.

The PCC became an eight-team league this year with the addition of USC and Idaho; the Vandals won the season title, and repeated the next year.

References

External links
Sports Reference – Washington State Cougars: 1921–22 basketball season

Washington State Cougars men's basketball seasons
Washington State Cougars
Washington State
Washington State